Beau Molenaar (born 10 March 1985) is a Dutch footballer who plays as a goalkeeper for Norwegian club Åkra IL, having previously played for FK Haugesund, Notodden FK, Apollon Limassol, AZ, FC Omniworld and Skeid.

External links
 Beau Molenaar ready for FKH (Norwegian)

1985 births
Living people
Sportspeople from Alkmaar
Dutch footballers
Association football goalkeepers
AZ Alkmaar players
Almere City FC players
Apollon Limassol FC players
Notodden FK players
FK Haugesund players
Skeid Fotball players
Norwegian First Division players
Cypriot First Division players
Eerste Divisie players
Dutch expatriate footballers
Expatriate footballers in Cyprus
Expatriate footballers in Norway
Footballers from North Holland